Parapercis allporti, the barred grubfish, is a fish species in the sandperch family, Pinguipedidae. It is found in the Eastern Indian Ocean, in southern Australia, from South Australia to New South Wales and Tasmania.

References

May, J.L. and J.G.H. Maxwell, 1986. Trawl fish from temperate waters of Australia. CSIRO Division of Fisheries Research, Tasmania. 492 p.

Pinguipedidae
Taxa named by Albert Günther
Fish described in 1876